The Suzuki Spacia is a kei car produced by Suzuki. It was a replacement for the Suzuki Palette, which was discontinued in February 2013. It improves upon fuel efficiency, is lighter and features a larger cabin than its predecessor. The vehicle is also supplied to Mazda as the Mazda Flair Wagon.



First generation (MK32S/42S; 2013)

The first-generation Spacia was released in March 2013 with three grades; G, X and the turbocharged T. The Flair Wagon followed later in April with two grades; XG and XS, all with naturally aspirated engine.

The upmarket variant called Spacia Custom was released in June 2013 with three grades; GS, XS and the turbocharged TS. Mazda also introduced their version of the Spacia Custom as Flair Wagon Custom Style a month later with two grades; XS and the turbocharged XT.

Limited editions based on X and XS grades were launched in June 2014. Mazda also launched a limited edition based on XS grade in the same month. Another limited edition of Spacia Custom XS called J Style was launched in December.

The car received its facelift in May 2015. A limited edition based on G grade was launched in December.

New Z grade was added to the Spacia Custom line up in December 2016, it has different front end and not adopted by Mazda.

Second generation (MK53S; 2017)

The second-generation Spacia was unveiled at the 2017 Tokyo Motor Show, along with the Spacia Custom. It is built on the same lightweight HEARTECT platform as the sixth-generation Wagon R. Both the Spacia and Spacia Custom went on sale on 14 December 2017. The Spacia is available in G and X grade levels, while the Spacia Custom is available in GS, XS and XS Turbo grade levels. Both are only available with hybrid powertrain.

On 20 December 2018, the crossover variant of the second-generation Spacia, called Spacia Gear, was released and is available in XZ and XZ Turbo grade levels with hybrid powertrain.

Both the second-generation Spacia and Spacia Custom received their facelift on 3 December 2021 with new grille design, as well as a special edition variant for Spacia Gear called "My Style".

On 26 August 2022, the commercial variant of the second-generation Spacia, called Spacia Base, was released with pre-facelift Spacia Custom's front fascia while retaining the regular Spacia's rear lamps and rear bumper. It is available in GF and XF grade levels with naturally aspirated engine.

References

External links

 (Mazda Flair Wagon)

Spacia
Cars introduced in 2013
Front-wheel-drive vehicles
Kei cars
Hatchbacks
Vehicles with CVT transmission